Dihi Baliharpur is a  village in the Daspur I CD block in the Ghatal subdivision of the Paschim Medinipur district in the state of West Bengal, India.

Geography

Location

Area overview
Ishwar Chandra Vidyasagar, scholar, social reformer and a key figure of the Bengal Renaissance, was born at Birsingha on 26 September 1820.

Ghatal subdivision, shown in the map alongside, has alluvial soils. Around 85% of the total cultivated area is cropped more than once. It  has a density of population of 1,099 per km2, but being a small subdivision only a little over a fifth of the people in the district reside in this subdivision. 14.33% of the population lives in urban areas and 86.67% lives in the rural areas.

Note: The map alongside presents some of the notable locations in the subdivision. All places marked in the map are linked in the larger full screen map.

Demographics
According to the 2011 Census of India, Dihi Baliharpur had a total population of 867, of which 456 (53%) were males and 411 (47%) were females. There were 93 persons in the age range of 0–6 years. The total number of literate persons in Dihi Baliharpur was 698 (90.18% of the population over 6 years).

Culture
David J. McCutchion mentions the Dihi Baliharpur temple as richly decorated pancha-ratna with smooth rekha turrets and porch on three arches.

He also mentions two other temples:
The Brajaraja-Kisora temple as an ek-ratna with smooth rekha tower of the smaller Daspur type generally with the tower displaced to the back, measuring 27' x 22' 6", with rich terracotta facade. 
The Genriburi temple, in the same category as Brajaraja-Kisora temple, measuring 28' 4" x 21' 3", plain, built in 1757.

Dihi Baliharpur picture gallery

References

External links

Villages in Paschim Medinipur district